Sir Roger Jones, 1st Viscount Ranelagh PC (Ire) (before 1589 – 1643) was joint Lord President of Connaught with Charles Wilmot, 1st Viscount Wilmot. He commanded the government forces in Connaught during the Irish Rebellion of 1641 and the beginning of the Irish Confederate Wars defending Athlone against James Dillon until February 1643.

Birth and origin 
Roger was born before 1589 in Ireland, the only son of Thomas Jones and his wife Margaret Purdon. His father was an Anglican minister and had been consecrated Bishop of Meath in 1584, which was probably already the position he held at the time of Roger's birth. From Bishop he would be further advanced in 1605 to Archbishop of Dublin and Lord Chancellor of Ireland. His father's family was from Lancashire in England. His mother was a daughter of Adam Purdon of Lurgan Race, County Louth. His mother was the sister-in-law of Adam Loftus, Archbishop of Dublin.

Early life 
In October 1605 his father was appointed Lord Chancellor of Ireland and in November he became Archbishop of Dublin. On 26 March 1607 Jones was knighted at Drogheda and was henceforth known as Sir Roger Jones.

In 1608 his father became involved in a bitter feud with Christopher St Lawrence, 10th Baron Howth (also numbered as the 9th baron), in which Sir Roger Jones also became embroiled. His reference to Howth as a brave man among cowards was enough to provoke his opponent, a notoriously quarrelsome man, to violence. On 24 November 1609, Jones, Howth and their followers engaged in a violent fracas at a tennis court in Thomas Street, Dublin, in which a Mr. Barnewall was killed. The Lord Deputy of Ireland, Sir Arthur Chichester, an enemy of Howth, had him arrested immediately because he thought it murder, but it was found to be manslaughter.

First marriage and children 
In 1609 Sir Roger Jones married Frances Moore, the daughter of Sir Garret Moore, 1st Viscount Moore of Drogheda by his wife Mary Colley, daughter of Sir Henry Colley.

Roger and Frances had four children, two boys and two girls:
Arthur, his successor, married Lady Catherine Boyle, who was the daughter of Richard Boyle, 1st Earl of Cork, and also the older sister of the pioneering chemist Robert Boyle and of the writer Mary Rich, Countess of Warwick
Margaret, married John Clotworthy, 1st Viscount Massereene
Mary, married firstly Lieutenant Colonel John Chichester, son of Edward Chichester, 1st Viscount Chichester. Their son Arthur Chichester, 2nd Earl of Donegall,  inherited the earldom from his uncle. They also had a daughter Elizabeth, who married Sir John Cole, 1st Baronet. After Chichester's death, Mary remarried Colonel Christopher Copley of Wadworth, and had further issue
Thomas, who married Elizabeth, daughter of John Harris and whose descendants would reclaim the Ranelagh viscountcy in 1759 after it had lain dormant since the death of Richard Jones, 1st Earl of Ranelagh in 1712

Midlife 
Sir Roger Jones was a member of the Parliament of Ireland for the borough of Trim in County Meath from 1613 to 1615. On 10 April 1619 his father, the archbishop died. On 20 August 1619, he signed for the first time as a member of the Privy Council of Ireland under Lord Deputy Oliver St John and Lord Chancellor Adam Loftus. On 23 November 1620 his first wife died. On 25 August 1628, Sir Roger was created 1st Viscount Ranelagh and Baron Jones of Navan by King Charles I.

Second marriage and daughter 
Ranelagh, as he was now, married as his second wife Catherine Longueville, daughter of Sir Henry Longueville, of Wolverton, co. Buckingham by his wife Katherine Cary, sister of Henry Cary, 1st Viscount Falkland, Lord Deputy of Ireland from 1622 to 1629.

Roger and Catherine had one daughter:
Elizabeth, married Colonel Robert Sandys, son of Sir Edwin Sandys

His second wife died in 1627.

President of Connaught, death, and timeline 
On 11 September 1630 Ranelagh was appointed joint President of Connaught alongside Charles Wilmot, 1st Viscount Wilmot of Ahlone, who had occupied this post alone since 3 June 1616. Ranelagh went to Athlone and took over the command of the troops and fortresses of the province, whereas Wilmot tried to play a role in Dublin, but kept the title and outlived Ranelagh, dying shortly after him, late in 1643 or early in 1644.

During the 5th session of the Parliament 1640–1649 the Catholic MPs tried to impeach Ranelagh, but the impeachment failed due to the opposition of the Protestant MPs.

After the outbreak of the Irish Rebellion in 1641 Ranelagh defended Athlone during 1642 against confederate troops led by James Dillon. in January 1643 the Lord Justices (Sir Henry Tichborne and John Borlase) sent Sir Richard Grenville to Athlone to bring him provisions, but Ranelagh decided to abandon Athlone and he and the garrison accompanied Grenville back to Dublin. On the way back they met a confederate force that Grenville defeated in the Battle of Rathconnell on 7 February 1643. At Dublin Ranelagh was accused to have failed in his duties as president of Connaught. A document of 74 articles was written and sent to the King. Ranelagh was first forbidden to leave Ireland, but the King then allowed him to come to Oxford and explain himself.

In 1643 Ranelagh died in Oxford while attending King Charles I. He was succeeded by his son Arthur as the 2nd Viscount Ranelagh.

Notes and references

Notes

Citations

Sources 

  – 1221 to 1690
  – (for Ranelagh)
  – (for timetable: Strafford)
  – 1641 to 1643
  – N to R (for Ranelagh)
  – 1665 to 1707 (for Domville)
  – (for timeline)
 
 
  – Viscounts (for Ranelagh)
 
 
  – From the reign of Henry III to Constantine Phipps (for his father)
  – (Preview)
 
 
 
 
 

16th-century births
1643 deaths
16th-century Irish people
17th-century Irish people
Members of the Parliament of Ireland (pre-1801) for County Meath constituencies
Members of the Privy Council of Ireland
Military personnel killed in action
Peers of Ireland created by Charles I
Viscounts in the Peerage of Ireland